Sir Charles Christian Nicholson, 3rd Baronet (born 15 December 1941) is a British baronet.

He is the older son of Sir John Norris Nicholson, 2nd Baronet and Vittoria Vivien née Trewhella: he has one brother and two sisters. He was educated at Ampleforth College and Magdalen College, Oxford. In 1975 he married Martha, widow of Niall Anstruther-Gough-Calthorpe: he has one step son and one step daughter.

Notes

 

1941 births
Living people
Cheshire Regiment officers
People educated at Ampleforth College
Alumni of Magdalen College, Oxford
Baronets in the Baronetage of the United Kingdom